The 1981 Montana Grizzlies football team represented the University of Montana in the 1981 NCAA Division I-AA football season. A charter member of the Big Sky Conference, the Grizzlies were led by second-year head coach Larry Donovan and played their home games at Dornblaser Field in Missoula.

Montana had an overall record of 7–3 and finished third in the Big Sky at 5–2.

Montana was the only team to defeat Idaho State in 1981; a tie-breaking field goal with seconds remaining was the difference. The Bengals went on to win the conference title and the Division I-AA championship.

Schedule

Source:

References

External links
Montana Grizzlies football – 1981 media guide

Montana
Montana Grizzlies football seasons
Montana Grizzlies football